The Vedas are a large body of religious texts originating in ancient India. Composed in Vedic Sanskrit, the texts constitute the oldest layer of Sanskrit literature and the oldest scriptures of Hinduism.

There are four Vedas: the Rigveda, the Yajurveda, the Samaveda and the Atharvaveda. Each Veda has four subdivisions – the Samhitas (mantras and benedictions), the Aranyakas (text on rituals, ceremonies, sacrifices and symbolic-sacrifices), the Brahmanas (commentaries on rituals, ceremonies and sacrifices), and the Upanishads (texts discussing meditation, philosophy and spiritual knowledge). Some scholars add a fifth category – the Upasanas (worship). The texts of the Upanishads discuss ideas akin to the heterodox sramana-traditions.

Hindus consider the Vedas to be apauruṣeya, which means "not of a man, superhuman" and "impersonal, authorless," revelations of sacred sounds and texts heard by ancient sages after intense meditation.

The Vedas have been orally transmitted since the 2nd millennium BCE with the help of elaborate mnemonic techniques. The mantras, the oldest part of the Vedas, are recited in the modern age for their phonology rather than the semantics, and are considered to be "primordial rhythms of creation", preceding the forms to which they refer. By reciting them the cosmos is regenerated, "by enlivening and nourishing the forms of creation at their base."

The various Indian philosophies and Hindu denominations have taken differing positions on the Vedas; schools of Indian philosophy that acknowledge the primal authority of the Vedas are classified as "orthodox" (āstika). Other śramaṇa traditions, such as Charvaka, Ajivika, Buddhism, and Jainism, which did not regard the Vedas as authorities, are referred to as "heterodox" or "non-orthodox" (nāstika) schools.

Etymology and usage
The Sanskrit word  "knowledge, wisdom"  is derived from the root vid- "to know". This is reconstructed as being derived from the Proto-Indo-European root , meaning "see" or "know."

The noun is from Proto-Indo-European , cognate to Greek  "aspect", "form" . This is not to be confused with the homonymous 1st and 3rd person singular perfect tense , cognate to Greek  (w)oida "I know". Root cognates are Greek ἰδέα, English wit, etc., Latin videō "I see", German wissen "to know" etc.

The Sanskrit term  as a common noun means "knowledge". The term in some contexts, such as hymn 10.93.11 of the Rigveda, means "obtaining or finding wealth, property", while in some others it means "a bunch of grass together" as in a broom or for ritual fire.

Vedas are called Maṛai or Vaymoli in parts of South India. Marai literally means "hidden, a secret, mystery". But the Tamil Naan Marai mentioned in Tholkappiam is not Sanskrit Vedas. In some parts of South India (e.g. the Iyengar communities), the word veda is used in the Tamil writings of the Alvar saints. Such writings include the Naalayira Divya Prabandham (aka Tiruvaymoli).

Vedic texts

Vedic Sanskrit corpus
The term "Vedic texts" is used in two distinct meanings:
 Texts composed in Vedic Sanskrit during the Vedic period (Iron Age India)
 Any text considered as "connected to the Vedas" or a "corollary of the Vedas"

The corpus of Vedic Sanskrit texts includes:
 The Samhitas (Sanskrit , "collection"), are collections of metric texts ("mantras"). There are four "Vedic" Samhitas: the Rig-Veda, Yajur-Veda, Sama-Veda and Atharva-Veda, most of which are available in several recensions. In some contexts, the term Veda is used to refer only to these Samhitas, the collection of mantras. This is the oldest layer of Vedic texts, which were composed between circa 1500–1200 BCE (Rig Veda book 2–9), and 1200–900 BCE for the other Samhitas. The Samhitas contain invocations to deities like Indra and Agni, "to secure their benediction for success in battles or for welfare of the clan." The complete corpus of Vedic mantras as collected in Bloomfield's Vedic Concordance (1907) consists of some 89,000 padas (metrical feet), of which 72,000 occur in the four Samhitas.
 The Brahmanas are prose texts that comment and explain the solemn rituals as well as expound on their meaning and many connected themes. Each of the Brahmanas is associated with one of the Samhitas or its recensions. The oldest dated to about 900 BCE, while the youngest Brahmanas (such as the Shatapatha Brahmana), were complete by about 700 BCE. The Brahmanas may either form separate texts or can be partly integrated into the text of the Samhitas. They may also include the Aranyakas and Upanishads.
 The Aranyakas, "wilderness texts" or "forest treaties", were composed by people who meditated in the woods as recluses and are the third part of the Vedas. The texts contain discussions and interpretations of ceremonies, from ritualistic to symbolic meta-ritualistic points of view. It is frequently read in secondary literature.
 Older Principal Upanishads (Chandogya, Kena, Aitareya, and others), composed between 800 BCE and the end of the Vedic period. The Upanishads are largely philosophical works, some in dialogue form. They are the foundation of Hindu philosophical thought and its diverse traditions. Of the Vedic corpus, they alone are widely known, and the central ideas of the Upanishads are still influential in Hinduism.
 The texts considered "Vedic" in the sense of "corollaries of the Vedas" are less clearly defined, and may include numerous post-Vedic texts such as the later Upanishads and the Sutra literature, such as Shrauta Sutras and Gryha Sutras, which are smriti texts. Together, the Vedas and these Sutras form part of the Vedic Sanskrit corpus.

While production of Brahmanas and Aranyakas ceased with the end of the Vedic period, additional Upanishads were composed after the end of the Vedic period. The Brahmanas, Aranyakas, and Upanishads, among other things, interpret and discuss the Samhitas in philosophical and metaphorical ways to explore abstract concepts such as the Absolute (Brahman), and the soul or the self (Atman), introducing Vedanta philosophy, one of the major trends of later Hinduism. In other parts, they show evolution of ideas, such as from actual sacrifice to symbolic sacrifice, and of spirituality in the Upanishads. This has inspired later Hindu scholars such as Adi Shankara to classify each Veda into karma-kanda (कर्म खण्ड, action/sacrificial ritual-related sections, the Samhitas and Brahmanas); and jnana-kanda (ज्ञान खण्ड, knowledge/spirituality-related sections, mainly the Upanishads').

Śruti and smriti 
This indigenous system of categorization was adopted by Max Müller and, while it is subject to some debate, it is still widely used. As Axel Michaels explains:

Among the widely known śrutis include the Vedas and their embedded texts—the Samhitas, the Upanishads, the Brahmanas and the Aranyakas. The well-known smṛtis include Bhagavad Gita, Bhagavata Purana and the epics Ramayana and Mahabharata, amongst others.

Authorship
Hindus consider the Vedas to be apauruṣeyā, which means "not of a man, superhuman" and "impersonal, authorless." The Vedas, for orthodox Indian theologians, are considered revelations seen by ancient sages after intense meditation, and texts that have been more carefully preserved since ancient times. In the Hindu Epic Mahabharata, the creation of Vedas is credited to Brahma. The Vedic hymns themselves assert that they were skillfully created by Rishis (sages), after inspired creativity, just as a carpenter builds a chariot.

The oldest part of the Rig Veda Samhita was orally composed in north-western India (Punjab) between  1500 and 1200 BCE, while book 10 of the Rig Veda, and the other Samhitas were composed between 1200 and 900 BCE more eastward, between the Yamuna and the Ganges rivers, the heartland of Aryavarta and the Kuru Kingdom (c. 1200 – c. 900 BCE). The "circum-Vedic" texts, as well as the redaction of the Samhitas, date to c. 1000–500 BCE.

According to tradition, Vyasa is the compiler of the Vedas, who arranged the four kinds of mantras into four Samhitas (Collections).

Chronology, transmission, and interpretation

Chronology
The Vedas are among the oldest sacred texts. The bulk of the Rigveda Samhita was composed in the northwestern region (Punjab) of the Indian subcontinent, most likely between  1500 and 1200 BCE, although a wider approximation of  1700–1100 BCE has also been given. The other three Samhitas are considered to date from the time of the Kuru Kingdom, approximately  1200–900 BCE. The "circum-Vedic" texts, as well as the redaction of the Samhitas, date to c. 1000–500 BCE, resulting in a Vedic period, spanning the mid 2nd to mid 1st millennium BCE, or the Late Bronze Age and the Iron Age.
The Vedic period reaches its peak only after the composition of the mantra texts, with the establishment of the various shakhas all over Northern India which annotated the mantra samhitas with Brahmana discussions of their meaning, and reaches its end in the age of Buddha and Panini and the rise of the Mahajanapadas (archaeologically, Northern Black Polished Ware). Michael Witzel gives a time span of c. 1500 to c. 500–400 BCE. Witzel makes special reference to the Near Eastern Mitanni material of the 14th century BCE, the only epigraphic record of Indo-Aryan contemporary to the Rigvedic period. He gives 150 BCE (Patañjali) as a terminus ante quem for all Vedic Sanskrit literature, and 1200 BCE (the early Iron Age) as terminus post quem for the Atharvaveda.

Transmission
The Vedas were orally transmitted since their composition in the Vedic period for several millennia. The authoritative transmission of the Vedas is by an oral tradition in a sampradaya from father to son or from teacher (guru) to student (shishya), believed to be initiated by the Vedic rishis who heard the primordial sounds. Only this tradition, embodied by a living teacher, can teach the correct pronunciation of the sounds and explain hidden meanings, in a way the "dead and entombed manuscript" cannot do. As Leela Prasad states, "According to Shankara, the "correct tradition" (sampradaya) has as much authority as the written Shastra," explaining that the tradition "bears the authority to clarify and provide direction in the application of knowledge."

The emphasis in this transmission is on the "proper articulation and pronunciation of the Vedic sounds", as prescribed in the Shiksha, the Vedanga (Vedic study) of sound as uttered in a Vedic recitation, mastering the texts "literally forward and backward in fully acoustic fashion." Houben and Rath note that the Vedic textual tradition cannot simply be characterized as oral, "since it also depends significantly on a memory culture." The Vedas were preserved with precision with the help of elaborate mnemonic techniques, such as memorizing the texts in eleven different modes of recitation (pathas), using the alphabet as a mnemotechnical device, "matching physical movements (such as nodding the head) with particular sounds and chanting in a group" and visualizing sounds by using mudras (hand signs). This provided an additional visual confirmation, and also an alternate means to check the reading integrity by the audience, in addition to the audible means. Houben and Rath note that a strong "memory culture" existed in ancient India when texts were transmitted orally, before the advent of writing in the early first millennium CE. According to Staal, criticising the Goody-Watt hypothesis "according to which literacy is more reliable than orality," this tradition of oral transmission "is closely related to Indian forms of science," and "by far the more remarkable" than the relatively recent tradition of written transmission.

While according to Mookerji understanding the meaning (vedarthajnana or artha-bodha) of the words of the Vedas was part of the Vedic learning, Holdrege and other Indologists have noted that in the transmission of the Samhitas the emphasis is on the phonology of the sounds (śabda) and not on the meaning (artha) of the mantras. Already at the end of the Vedic period their original meaning had become obscure for "ordinary people," and niruktas, etymological compendia, were developed to preserve and clarify the original meaning of many Sanskrit words. According to Staal, as referenced by Holdrege, though the mantras may have a discursive meaning, when the mantras are recited in the Vedic rituals "they are disengaged from their original context and are employed in ways that have little or nothing to do with their meaning." The words of the mantras are "themselves sacred," and "do not constitute linguistic utterances." Instead, as Klostermaier notes, in their application in Vedic rituals they become magical sounds, "means to an end." Holdrege notes that there are scarce commentaries on the meaning of the mantras, in contrast to the number of commentaries on the Brahmanas and Upanishads, but states that the lack of emphasis on the "discursive meaning does not necessarily imply that they are meaningless." In the Brahmanical perspective, the sounds have their own meaning, mantras are considered as "primordial rhythms of creation", preceding the forms to which they refer. By reciting them the cosmos is regenerated, "by enlivening and nourishing the forms of creation at their base. As long as the purity of the sounds is preserved, the recitation of the mantras will be efficacious, irrespective of whether their discursive meaning is understood by human beings." Frazier further notes that "later Vedic texts sought deeper understanding of the reasons the rituals worked," which indicates that the Brahmin communities considered study to be a "process of understanding."

A literary tradition is traceable in post-Vedic times, after the rise of Buddhism in the Maurya period, perhaps earliest in the Kanva recension of the Yajurveda about the 1st century BCE; however oral tradition of transmission remained active. Jack Goody has argued for an earlier literary tradition, concluding that the Vedas bear hallmarks of a literate culture along with oral transmission, but Goody's views have been strongly criticised by Falk, Lopez Jr,. and Staal, though they have also found some support.

The Vedas were written down only after 500 BCE, but only the orally transmitted texts are regarded as authoritative, given the emphasis on the exact pronunciation of the sounds. Witzel suggests that attempts to write down the Vedic texts towards the end of 1st millennium BCE were unsuccessful, resulting in smriti rules explicitly forbidding the writing down of the Vedas. Due to the ephemeral nature of the manuscript material (birch bark or palm leaves), surviving manuscripts rarely surpass an age of a few hundred years. The Sampurnanand Sanskrit University has a Rigveda manuscript from the 14th century; however, there are a number of older Veda manuscripts in Nepal that are dated from the 11th century onwards.

Vedic learning

The Vedas, Vedic rituals and its ancillary sciences called the Vedangas, were part of the curriculum at ancient universities such as at Taxila, Nalanda and Vikramashila. According to Deshpande, "the tradition of the Sanskrit grammarians also contributed significantly to the preservation and interpretation of Vedic texts." Yāska (4th c. BCE) wrote the Nirukta, which reflects the concerns about the loss of meaning of the mantras, while Pāṇinis (4th c. BCE) Aṣṭādhyāyī is the most important surviving text of the Vyākaraṇa traditions. Mimamsa scholar Sayanas (14th c. CE) major Vedartha Prakasha is a rare commentary on the Vedas, which is also referred to by contemporary scholars.

Yaska and Sayana, reflecting an ancient understanding, state that the Veda can be interpreted in three ways, giving "the truth about gods, dharma and parabrahman." The pūrva-kāņda (or karma-kanda), the part of the Veda dealing with ritual, gives knowledge of dharma, "which brings us satisfaction." The uttara-kanda (or jnana-kanda), the part of the Veda dealing with the knowledge of the absolute, gives knowledge of Parabrahma, "which fulfills all of our desires." According to Holdrege, for the exponents of karma-kandha the Veda is to be "inscribed in the minds and hearts of men" by memorization and recitation, while for the exponents of the jnana-kanda and meditation the Vedas express a transcendental reality which can be approached with mystical means.

Holdrege notes that in Vedic learning "priority has been given to recitation over interpretation" of the Samhitas. Galewicz states that Sayana, a Mimamsa scholar, "thinks of the Veda as something to be trained and mastered to be put into practical ritual use," noticing that "it is not the meaning of the mantras that is most essential [...] but rather the perfect mastering of their sound form." According to Galewicz, Sayana saw the purpose (artha) of the Veda as the "artha of carrying out sacrifice," giving precedence to the Yajurveda. For Sayana, whether the mantras had meaning depended on the context of their practical usage. This conception of the Veda, as a repertoire to be mastered and performed, takes precedence over the internal meaning or "autonomous message of the hymns." Most Śrauta rituals are not performed in the modern era, and those that are, are rare.

Mukherjee notes that the Rigveda, and Sayana's commentary, contain passages criticizing as fruitless mere recitation of the Ŗik (words) without understanding their inner meaning or essence, the knowledge of dharma and Parabrahman. Mukherjee concludes that in the Rigvedic education of the mantras "the contemplation and comprehension of their meaning was considered as more important and vital to education than their mere mechanical repetition and correct pronunciation." Mookei refers to Sayana as stating that "the mastery of texts, akshara-praptī, is followed by artha-bodha, perception of their meaning." Mukherjee explains that the Vedic knowledge was first perceived by the rishis and munis. Only the perfect language of the Vedas, as in contrast to ordinary speech, can reveal these truths, which were preserved by committing them to memory. According to Mukherjee, while these truths are imparted to the student by the memorized texts, "the realization of Truth" and the knowledge of paramatman as revealed to the rishis is the real aim of Vedic learning, and not the mere recitation of texts. The supreme knowledge of the Absolute, para Brahman-jnana, the knowledge of rta and satya, can be obtained by taking vows of silence and obedience sense-restraint, dhyana, the practice of tapas (austerities), and discussing the Vedanta.

Vedic schools or recensions

The four Vedas were transmitted in various s (branches, schools). Each school likely represented an ancient community of a particular area, or kingdom. Each school followed its own canon. Multiple recensions are known for each of the Vedas. Thus, states Witzel as well as Renou, in the 2nd millennium BCE, there was likely no canon of one broadly accepted Vedic texts, no Vedic “Scripture”, but only a canon of various texts accepted by each school. Some of these texts have survived, most lost or yet to be found. Rigveda that survives in modern times, for example, is in only one extremely well preserved school of Śåkalya, from a region called Videha, in modern north Bihar, south of Nepal. The Vedic canon in its entirety consists of texts from all the various Vedic schools taken together.

Each of the four Vedas were shared by the numerous schools, but revised, interpolated and adapted locally, in and after the Vedic period, giving rise to various recensions of the text. Some texts were revised into the modern era, raising significant debate on parts of the text which are believed to have been corrupted at a later date.

Prodigious energy was expended by ancient Indian culture in ensuring that these texts were transmitted from generation to generation with inordinate fidelity. For example, memorization of the sacred Vedas included up to eleven forms of recitation of the same text. The texts were subsequently "proof-read" by comparing the different recited versions. That these methods have been effective, is attested to by the preservation of the most ancient Indian religious text, the Rigveda, as redacted into a single text during the Brahmana period, without any variant readings within that school.

The Vedas were orally transmitted by memorization, and were written down only after 500 BCE,</ref> All printed editions of the Vedas that survive in the modern times are likely the version existing in about the 16th century CE.

Four Vedas

The canonical division of the Vedas is fourfold viz.,
 Rigveda  (RV)
 Yajurveda  (YV, with the main division TS vs. VS)
 Samaveda  (SV)
 Atharvaveda  (AV)

Of these, the first three were the principal original division, also called ""; that is, "the triple science" of reciting hymns (Rigveda), performing sacrifices (Yajurveda), and chanting songs (Samaveda). The Rig Veda most likely was composed between  1500 BCE and 1200 BCE. Witzel notes that it is the Vedic period itself, where incipient lists divide the Vedic texts into three (trayī) or four branches: Rig, Yajur, Sama and Atharva.

Each Veda has been subclassified into four major text types – the Samhitas (mantras and benedictions), the Aranyakas (text on rituals, ceremonies such as newborn baby's rites of passage, coming of age, marriages, retirement and cremation, sacrifices and symbolic sacrifices), the Brahmanas (commentaries on rituals, ceremonies and sacrifices), and the Upanishads (text discussing meditation, philosophy and spiritual knowledge). The Upasanas (short ritual worship-related sections) are considered by some scholars as the fifth part. Witzel notes that the rituals, rites and ceremonies described in these ancient texts reconstruct to a large degree the Indo-European marriage rituals observed in a region spanning the Indian subcontinent, Persia and the European area, and some greater details are found in the Vedic era texts such as the Grhya Sūtras.

Only one version of the Rigveda is known to have survived into the modern era. Several different versions of the Sama Veda and the Atharva Veda are known, and many different versions of the Yajur Veda have been found in different parts of South Asia.

The texts of the Upanishads discuss ideas akin to the heterodox sramana-traditions.

Rigveda

The Rigveda Samhita is the oldest extant Indic text.  It is a collection of 1,028 Vedic Sanskrit hymns and 10,600 verses in all, organized into ten books (Sanskrit: mandalas). The hymns are dedicated to Rigvedic deities.

The books were composed by poets from different priestly groups over a period of several centuries between  1500 and 1200 BCE, (the early Vedic period) in the Punjab (Sapta Sindhu) region of the northwest Indian subcontinent. According to Michael Witzel, the initial codification of the Rigveda took place at the end of the Rigvedic period at ca. 1200 BCE, in the early Kuru kingdom.

The Rigveda is structured based on clear principles. The Veda begins with a small book addressed to Agni, Indra, Soma and other gods, all arranged according to decreasing total number of hymns in each deity collection; for each deity series, the hymns progress from longer to shorter ones, but the number of hymns per book increases. Finally, the meter too is systematically arranged from jagati and tristubh to anustubh and gayatri as the text progresses.

The rituals became increasingly complex over time, and the king's association with them strengthened both the position of the Brahmans and the kings. The Rajasuya rituals, performed with the coronation of a king, "set in motion [...] cyclical regenerations of the universe." In terms of substance, the nature of hymns shift from praise of deities in early books to Nasadiya Sukta with questions such as, "what is the origin of the universe?, do even gods know the answer?", the virtue of Dāna (charity) in society, and other metaphysical issues in its hymns.

There are similarities between the mythology, rituals and linguistics in Rigveda and those found in ancient central Asia, Iranian and Hindukush (Afghanistan) regions.

Samaveda

The Samaveda Samhita consists of 1549 stanzas, taken almost entirely (except for 75 mantras) from the Rigveda. While its earliest parts are believed to date from as early as the Rigvedic period, the existing compilation dates from the post-Rigvedic Mantra period of Vedic Sanskrit, between c. 1200 and 1000 BCE or "slightly later," roughly contemporary with the Atharvaveda and the Yajurveda.

The Samaveda samhita has two major parts. The first part includes four melody collections (gāna, गान) and the second part three verse “books” (ārcika, आर्चिक). A melody in the song books corresponds to a verse in the arcika books. Just as in the Rigveda, the early sections of Samaveda typically begin with hymns to Agni and Indra but shift to the abstract. Their meters shift also in a descending order. The songs in the later sections of the Samaveda have the least deviation from the hymns derived from the Rigveda.

In the Samaveda, some of the Rigvedic verses are repeated. Including repetitions, there are a total of 1875 verses numbered in the Samaveda recension translated by Griffith. Two major recensions have survived, the Kauthuma/Ranayaniya and the Jaiminiya.

Yajurveda

The Yajurveda Samhita consists of prose mantras. It is a compilation of ritual offering formulas that were said by a priest while an individual performed ritual actions such as those before the yajna fire. Witzel dates the Yajurveda hymns to the early Indian Iron Age, after c. 1200 and before 800 BCE. corresponding to the early Kuru Kingdom.

The earliest and most ancient layer of Yajurveda samhita includes about 1,875 verses, that are distinct yet borrow and build upon the foundation of verses in Rigveda. Unlike the Samaveda which is almost entirely based on Rigveda mantras and structured as songs, the Yajurveda samhitas are in prose, and they are different from earlier Vedic texts linguistically. The Yajur Veda has been the primary source of information about sacrifices during Vedic times and associated rituals.

There are two major groups of texts in this Veda: the "Black" (Krishna) and the "White" (Shukla). The term "black" implies "the un-arranged, motley collection" of verses in Yajurveda, in contrast to the "white" (well arranged) Yajurveda. The White Yajurveda separates the Samhita from its Brahmana (the Shatapatha Brahmana), the Black Yajurveda intersperses the Samhita with Brahmana commentary. Of the Black Yajurveda, texts from four major schools have survived (Maitrayani, Katha, Kapisthala-Katha, Taittiriya), while of the White Yajurveda, two (Kanva and Madhyandina). The youngest layer of Yajurveda text is not related to rituals nor sacrifice, it includes the largest collection of primary Upanishads, influential to various schools of Hindu philosophy.

Atharvaveda

The Artharvaveda Samhita is the text 'belonging to the Atharvan and Angirasa poets. It has about 760 hymns, and about 160 of the hymns are in common with the Rigveda. Most of the verses are metrical, but some sections are in prose. The Atharvaveda was not considered as a Veda in the Vedic era, and was accepted as a Veda in late 1st millennium BCE. It was compiled last, probably around 900 BCE, although some of its material may go back to the time of the Rigveda, or earlier.

The Atharvaveda is sometimes called the "Veda of magical formulas", an epithet declared to be incorrect by other scholars. The Samhita layer of the text likely represents a developing 2nd millennium BCE tradition of magico-religious rites to address superstitious anxiety, spells to remove maladies believed to be caused by demons, and herbs- and nature-derived potions as medicine. The text, states Kenneth Zysk, is one of oldest surviving record of the evolutionary practices in religious medicine and reveals the "earliest forms of folk healing of Indo-European antiquity". Many books of the Atharvaveda Samhita are dedicated to rituals without magic, such as to philosophical speculations and to theosophy.

The Atharva veda has been a primary source for information about Vedic culture, the customs and beliefs, the aspirations and frustrations of everyday Vedic life, as well as those associated with kings and governance. The text also includes hymns dealing with the two major rituals of passage – marriage and cremation. The Atharva Veda also dedicates significant portion of the text asking the meaning of a ritual.

Embedded Vedic texts

Brahmanas

The Brahmanas are commentaries, explanation of proper methods and meaning of Vedic Samhita rituals in the four Vedas. They also incorporate myths, legends and in some cases philosophy. Each regional Vedic shakha (school) has its own operating manual-like Brahmana text, most of which have been lost. A total of 19 Brahmana texts have survived into modern times: two associated with the Rigveda, six with the Yajurveda, ten with the Samaveda and one with the Atharvaveda. The oldest dated to about 900 BCE, while the youngest Brahmanas (such as the Shatapatha Brahmana), were complete by about 700 BCE. According to Jan Gonda, the final codification of the Brahmanas took place in pre-Buddhist times (ca. 600 BCE).

The substance of the Brahmana text varies with each Veda. For example, the first chapter of the Chandogya Brahmana, one of the oldest Brahmanas, includes eight ritual suktas (hymns) for the ceremony of marriage and rituals at the birth of a child. The first hymn is a recitation that accompanies offering a Yajna oblation to Agni (fire) on the occasion of a marriage, and the hymn prays for prosperity of the couple getting married. The second hymn wishes for their long life, kind relatives, and a numerous progeny. The third hymn is a mutual marriage pledge, between the bride and groom, by which the two bind themselves to each other. The sixth through last hymns of the first chapter in Chandogya Brahmana are ritual celebrations on the birth of a child and wishes for health, wealth, and prosperity with a profusion of cows and artha. However, these verses are incomplete expositions, and their complete context emerges only with the Samhita layer of text.

Aranyakas and Upanishads

The Aranyakas layer of the Vedas include rituals, discussion of symbolic meta-rituals, as well as philosophical speculations.

Aranyakas, however, neither are homogeneous in content nor in structure. They are a medley of instructions and ideas, and some include chapters of Upanishads within them. Two theories have been proposed on the origin of the word Aranyakas. One theory holds that these texts were meant to be studied in a forest, while the other holds that the name came from these being the manuals of allegorical interpretation of sacrifices, for those in Vanaprastha (retired, forest-dwelling) stage of their life, according to the historic age-based Ashrama system of human life.

The Upanishads reflect the last composed layer of texts in the Vedas. They are commonly referred to as Vedānta, variously interpreted to mean either the "last chapters, parts of the Vedas" or "the object, the highest purpose of the Veda". 
The central concern of the Upanishads are the connections "between parts of the human organism and cosmic realities." The Upanishads intend to create a hierarchy of connected and dependent realities, evoking a sense of unity of "the separate elements of the world and of human experience [compressing] them into a single form." The concepts of Brahman, the Ultimate Reality from which everything arises, and Ātman, the essence of the individual, are central ideas in the Upanishads, and knowing the correspondence between Ātman and Brahman as "the fundamental principle which shapes the world" permits the creation of an integrative vision of the whole. The Upanishads are the foundation of Hindu philosophical thought and its diverse traditions, and of the Vedic corpus, they alone are widely known, and the central ideas of the Upanishads have influenced the diverse traditions of Hinduism.

Aranyakas are sometimes identified as karma-kanda (ritualistic section), while the Upanishads are identified as jnana-kanda (spirituality section). In an alternate classification, the early part of Vedas are called Samhitas and the commentary are called the Brahmanas which together are identified as the ceremonial karma-kanda, while Aranyakas and Upanishads are referred to as the jnana-kanda.

Post-Vedic literature

Vedanga

The Vedangas developed towards the end of the vedic period, around or after the middle of the 1st millennium BCE. These auxiliary fields of Vedic studies emerged because the language of the Vedas, composed centuries earlier, became too archaic to the people of that time. The Vedangas were sciences that focused on helping understand and interpret the Vedas that had been composed many centuries earlier.

The six subjects of Vedanga are phonetics, poetic meter, grammar, etymology and linguistics (Nirukta), rituals and rites of passage, time keeping and astronomy.

Vedangas developed as ancillary studies for the Vedas, but its insights into meters, structure of sound and language, grammar, linguistic analysis and other subjects influenced post-Vedic studies, arts, culture and various schools of Hindu philosophy. The Kalpa Vedanga studies, for example, gave rise to the Dharma-sutras, which later expanded into Dharma-shastras.

Parisista

  "supplement, appendix"  is the term applied to various ancillary works of Vedic literature, dealing mainly with details of ritual and elaborations of the texts logically and chronologically prior to them: the Samhitas, Brahmanas, Aranyakas and Sutras.  Naturally classified with the Veda to which each pertains, Parisista works exist for each of the four Vedas.  However, only the literature associated with the Atharvaveda is extensive.
 The  is a very late text associated with the Rigveda canon.
 The  is a short metrical text of two chapters, with 113 and 95 verses respectively.
 The  Yajurveda has 3 parisistas The , which is also found as the second praśna of the ', the 
 For the Atharvaveda, there are 79 works, collected as 72 distinctly named parisistas.

Upaveda
The term upaveda ("applied knowledge") is used in traditional literature to designate the subjects of certain technical works. Lists of what subjects are included in this class differ among sources.
The Charanavyuha mentions four Upavedas:
 Archery  (Dhanurveda), associated with the Yajurveda
 Architecture (Sthapatyaveda), associated with the Rigveda.
 Music and sacred dance, associated with the Samaveda
 Medicine, associated with  the Atharvaveda.

"Fifth" and other Vedas
Some post-Vedic texts, including the Mahabharata, the Natyasastra and certain Puranas, refer to themselves as the "fifth Veda". The earliest reference to such a "fifth Veda" is found in the Chandogya Upanishad in hymn 7.1.2.

"Divya Prabandha", for example Tiruvaymoli, is a term for canonical Tamil texts considered as Vernacular Veda by some South Indian Hindus.

Other texts such as the Bhagavad Gita or the Vedanta Sutras are considered shruti or "Vedic" by some Hindu denominations but not universally within Hinduism. The Bhakti movement, and Gaudiya Vaishnavism in particular extended the term veda to include the Sanskrit Epics and Vaishnavite devotional texts such as the Pancharatra.

Puranas

The Puranas is a vast genre of encyclopedic Indian literature about a wide range of topics particularly myths, legends and other traditional lore. Several of these texts are named after major Hindu deities such as Vishnu, Shiva and Devi. There are 18 Maha Puranas (Great Puranas) and 18 Upa Puranas (Minor Puranas), with over 400,000 verses.

The Puranas have been influential in the Hindu culture. They are considered Vaidika (congruent with Vedic literature). The Bhagavata Purana has been among the most celebrated and popular text in the Puranic genre, and is of non-dualistic tenor. The Puranic literature wove with the Bhakti movement in India, and both Dvaita and Advaita scholars have commented on the underlying Vedanta themes in the Maha Puranas.

Authority of the Vedas
The various Hindu denominations and Indian philosophies have taken differing positions on the authority of the Vedas. Schools of Indian philosophy which acknowledge the authority of the Vedas are classified as "orthodox" (āstika). Other śramaṇa traditions, such as Charvaka, Ajivika, Buddhism and Jainism, which did not regard the Vedas as authorities, are referred to as "heterodox" or "non-orthodox" (nāstika) schools. 

Certain traditions which are often seen as being part of Hinduism also rejected the Vedas. For example, authors of the tantric Vaishnava Sahajiya tradition, like Siddha Mukundadeva, rejected the Vedas' authority. Likewise, some tantric Shaiva Agamas reject the Vedas. The Anandabhairava-tantra for example, states that "the wise man should not elect as his authority the word of the Vedas, which is full of impurity, produces but scanty and transitory fruits and is limited."

Though many religious Hindus implicitly acknowledge the authority of the Vedas, this acknowledgment is often "no more than a declaration that someone considers himself [or herself] a Hindu," and "most Indians today pay lip service to the Veda and have no regard for the contents of the text." Some Hindus challenge the authority of the Vedas, thereby implicitly acknowledging its importance to the history of Hinduism, states Lipner.

Hindu reform movement such as Arya Samaj and Brahmo Samaj accepted the authority of Vedas, while the authority of the Vedas has been rejected by Hindu modernists like Debendranath Tagore and Keshub Chandra Sen; and also by social reformers like B. R. Ambedkar.

Western Indology

The study of Sanskrit in the West began in the 17th century. In the early 19th century, Arthur Schopenhauer drew attention to Vedic texts, specifically the Upanishads. The importance of Vedic Sanskrit for Indo-European studies was also recognized in the early 19th century. English translations of the Samhitas were published in the later 19th century, in the Sacred Books of the East series edited by Müller between 1879 and 1910. Ralph T. H. Griffith also presented English translations of the four Samhitas, published 1889 to 1899.

Rigveda manuscripts were selected for inscription in UNESCO's Memory of the World Register in 2007.

See also

 Hindu philosophy
 Historical Vedic religion
 Pyramid Texts
 Shakha
 Vedic chant
 Brahminism

Notes

References

Sources

 
  Search
 

 
 
 
 
 
 
 
  
 

 
 
 
 
 

 
 
 
 
 
 

 
 
 
 

 
 
 
 
 

 
 

 
 
 

 
 

  (full text online)

Further reading
Overviews
 .
 .
 .
.
.

Concordances
 .
 .
.

Conference proceedings
 .
.

Journals
 .

External links

 .
 

 
Hindu texts
Sources of ancient Iranian religion
Sanskrit texts